Harbarnsen is a village and a former municipality in the district of Hildesheim in Lower Saxony, Germany. Since 1 November 2016, it is part of the municipality Lamspringe.

Geography 

Harbarnsen is situated in an agricultural region between the Weserbergland Schaumburg-Hameln Nature Park and the Harz, roughly 9 km southwest of Bad Salzdetfurth. Surrounding hill ranges, namely Sackwald, Harplage and Heber, are parts of the Lower Saxon Hills.

Division of the municipality 

The municipality of Harbarnsen consisted of two districts, Harbarnsen and Irmenseul.

References

External links 

Hildesheim (district)
Former municipalities in Lower Saxony